Mo' Money: Original Motion Picture Soundtrack is the soundtrack to the 1992 film of the same name. It was released June 23, 1992 on Perspective Records. The soundtrack peaked at six on the Billboard 200 chart. By September 1992, it was certified platinum in sales by the RIAA, after sales exceeding 1,000,000 copies in the United States.

Release and reception

The album peaked at number six on the U.S. Billboard 200 and reached the second spot on the R&B albums chart. The album was certified platinum in September 1992.

Adam Greenberg of AllMusic gave the soundtrack a mixed review, stating that "the album is a perfect blend for a fan of the early-'90s R&B sound, but doesn't really meet the same standard as music of later years."

Track listing

Sample credits
"Mo' Money Groove" contains a sample of "You Can't Love Me If You Don't Respect Me", written by James Brown and Lyn Collins, and performed by Lyn Collins; a sample of "Get Me Back On Time, Engine No. 9", written by Kenneth Gamble and Leon Huff, and performed by Wilson Pickett; a sample of "Welcome to the Terrordome", written by Hank Shocklee, Keith Shocklee and Carlton Ridenhour, and performed by Public Enemy; and a replay of "Soul Power", written by James Brown and Fred Wesley, and performed by James Brown.
"The Best Things in Life Are Free" contains a sample of "I Get Lifted", written by Harry Wayne Casey and Richard Finch, and performed by George McCrae.
"Ice Cream Dream" contains a sample of "So Wat Cha Sayin'", written by Erick Sermon and Parrish Smith, and performed by EPMD; a sample of "One Nation Under a Groove", written by George Clinton, Walter Morrison and Garry Shider, and performed by Funkadelic; a sample of "If It Don't Turn You On (You Oughta' Leave It Alone)", written by Billy Nichols and Allen J. Williams, and performed by B.T. Express; a sample of "FX & Scratches", written and performed by Simon Harris; a sample of "Impeach the President", written by Roy Hammond, and performed by The Honey Drippers; and a sample of "Fairplay", written by Trevor Romeo, Nellee Hooper and Rose Windross, and performed by Soul II Soul feat. Rose Windross.
"I Adore You" contains a sample of cover version of "Don't Make Me Over", written by Burt Bacharach and Hal David, and performed by Sybil, originally performed by Dionne Warwick.
"Get Off My Back" contains a sample of "Heartbreaker (Part I, Part II)", written by Roger Troutman, and performed by Zapp; a sample of "(Not Just) Knee Deep". written by George Clinton, and performed by Funkadelic; and a sample of "Give Up the Funk (Tear the Roof Off the Sucker)", written by Jerome Brailey, George Clinton and Bootsy Collins, and performed by Parliament.
"Let's Get Together (So Groovy Now)", contains a sample of "Reach Out of the Darkness", written by Jim Post, and performed by Friend and Lover.
"The New Style", contains a drum sample of "Last Night Changed It All (I Really Had a Ball)", written by Joseph B. Wheeler, and performed by Esther Williams.
"A Job Ain't Nuthin' But Work", contains a sample of "So Ruff, So Tuff", written by Roger Troutman and Larry Troutman, and performed by Roger; a sample of "Best of My Love", written by Maurice White and Al McKay, and performed by The Emotions; a sample of "Work That Sucker to Death", written by George Clinton, Bootsy Collins, Jeffrey Mitchell, Rahni Harris, Terry Philips and Ralph Hunt Jr., and performed by Xavier feat. George Clinton and Bootsy Collins; a sample of "Tough", written by James Biggs Moore III, Robert Ford Jr., Lawrence Smith and Russell Simmons, and performed by Kurtis Blow; a sample of "These Are The J.B.'s", written by James Brown and The J.B.'s, and performed by The J.B.'s; a sample of "The Champ", written by Harry Palmer, and performed by The Mohawks; a sample of "Rated X", written by Robert Bell, Ronald Bell, Donald Boyce, George Brown, Robert Mickens, Claydes Smith, Dennis Thomas, Curtis Williams and Richard Westfield, and performed by Kool & the Gang; and a replay of "Let's Work", written and performed by Prince.

Charts

Weekly charts

Year-end charts

Singles

"—" denotes releases that did not chart.

Certifications

Personnel
Information taken from Allmusic.
arranging – Lance Alexander, Big Daddy Kane, Color Me Badd, Flavor Flav, The Flow, Gary G-Wiz, Gary Hines, Janet Jackson, Jimmy Jam, Jellybean Johnson, Terry Lewis, MC Lyte, O'Dell, Hank Shocklee, Keith Shocklee, Stokley, Darron Story, Ralph Tresvant, Luther Vandross, Caron Wheeler
art direction – Richard Frankel
assistant(s) – Kyle Bess, Eric Butler, Kimm James, Mike Scotella, Scott Weatherspoon, Bradley Yost
bass – Mark Haynes
composing – Lew Brown, Kirk Franklin, Anthony Smith, A. Wheaton
cover photo – Bret Lopez
design – Richard Frankel, Brian Johnson
dialogue – Ashley Jackson, Christine Williams, Christy Williams
drum programming – Lance Alexander, Jimmy Jam, O'Dell
drums – Lance Alexander, Jellybean Johnson, Stokley Williams
editing – David Rideau
effects – Jimmy Jam
engineering – Gary Bell, Kyle Bess, Bruce Botnick, Eric Butler, Weldon Cochren, Ollie Cotton, Bob Fudjinski, Brian Gardner, Eve Glabman, Steve Hodge, Michael Hyde, Mickey Isley, Kimm James, Bill Lazerus, Paul Logas Jr., Kiki Nervil, David Rideau, Mike Scotella, Ray Seville, Ray Shields, Kim Spikes, Scott Weatherspoon, Bradley Yost
engineering assistant(s) – Kyle Bess, Eric Butler, Kimm James, Mike Scotella, Bradley Yost
executive production – Jimmy Jam, Terry Lewis
guitar – Lance Alexander, Jellybean Johnson, Frank Stribbling
keyboard programming – Jimmy Jam
keyboards – Lance Alexander, Floyd Fisher, Jimmy Jam, O'Dell
mastering – Brian Gardner
mixing – Steve Hodge, Paul Logus, Paul Logus Jr., David Rideau
multi-instruments – The Flow, Jimmy Jam, Terry Lewis
musician – The Flow, Jimmy Jam, Terry Lewis, Leslie Organ, James "Big Jim" Wright
organ – James "Big Jim" Wright
percussion – Lance Alexander, Jellybean Johnson
performer(s) – Bell Biv DeVoe, Big Daddy Kane, Color Me Badd, Johnny Gill, Janet Jackson, Lo-Key, MC Lyte, Mint Condition, Public Enemy, Sounds of Blackness, Ralph Tresvant, Luther Vandross, Caron Wheeler
photography – Bret Lopez
production – Lance Alexander, Bomb Squad Prod., Color Me Badd, Gary G-Wiz, Jimmy Jam, Jellybean Johnson, Terry Lewis, Mint Condition, Prof T., Hank Shocklee, Keith Shocklee
production coordination – Sue Owens
programming – Lance Alexander, Gary Bell, The Flow, Gary G-Wiz, Michael Hyde, Jimmy Jam, Jellybean Johnson, Terry Lewis, O'Dell, Prof T., Keith Shocklee, Stokley
rapping – Michael Bivins, Ronnie DeVoe, Ralph Tresvant
rhythm – Jimmy Jam, Terry Lewis
rhythm arranging – Lance Alexander, Color Me Badd, The Flow, Gary G-Wiz, Jimmy Jam, Jellybean Johnson, Terry Lewis, O'Dell, Prof T., Keith Shocklee
scratching – DJ Icy Rock
sequencing – Lance Alexander, The Flow, Gary G-Wiz, Jimmy Jam, Jellybean Johnson, Terry Lewis, O'Dell, Prof T., David Rideau, Keith Shocklee, Stokley, Scott Weatherspoon
sequencing assistant – Scott Weatherspoon
soloist – Frank Stribbling
spoken word – Ashley Jackson, Christy Williams
synclavier – Gary Bell, Michael Hyde
synclavier programming – Gary Bell, Michael Hyde
turntables – DJ Icy Rock
vocal arranging – Lance Alexander, Big Daddy Kane, Color Me Badd, Flavor Flav, The Flow, Gary Hines, Janet Jackson, Jimmy Jam, Jellybean Johnson, Krush, Terry Lewis, MC Lyte, O'Dell, Prof T., Hank Shocklee, Stokley, Darron Story, Ralph Tresvant, Luther Vandross, Caron Wheeler, Stokley Williams
vocals – Big Daddy Kane, Color Me Badd, Flavor Flav, Johnny Gill, Ashley Jackson, Janet Jackson, J.R.(John Cleve Richardson), Krush, MC Lyte, Ann Nesby, Ange Smith, Stokley, Ralph Tresvant, Luther Vandross, Caron Wheeler, Christine Williams, Stokley Williams
vocals (background) – Joey Elias, Flavortons, Johnny Gill, Ashley Jackson, J.R.(John Cleve Richardson), Lisa Keith, Krush, Terry Lewis, Lo-Key, Mint Condition, Prof T., Ange Smith, Sounds of Blackness, Ralph Tresvant, Damon Wayans, Caron Wheeler, Christine Williams

Notes

External links
 
 Mo' Money at Discogs

1992 soundtrack albums
A&M Records albums
Albums produced by Jimmy Jam and Terry Lewis
Hip hop soundtracks
Rhythm and blues soundtracks
Comedy film soundtracks
Drama film soundtracks